The country of Belize has roughly 386 km of coastline, and has many coral reefs, cayes, and islands in the Caribbean Sea. The reef and its islands have been a UNESCO World Heritage Site since 1996.

Caribbean cayes
The following is a list of oceanic islands of Belize, arranged according to region but all of which are in the Caribbean Sea. River islands have not been listed.

1) The Islands number relates to the 2012 island numbering program made by Belize government for real estate purposes.

Ambergris group

Central groups
This group of islands form an arch around the capital city's coastline.

Southern groups
Gradually heading in a line southward, the cays decrease in size before reaching the coast of Honduras. and finally, towards the coast of Punta Gorda are some more islands.

Turneffe Atoll
The Turneffe Atoll is situated in the central Barrier Reef system, between the Inner Channel and Lighthouse Reef, and is 30 miles (48 km) long and 10 miles (16 km) wide. It is made up of a number of large cayes, such as Blackbird Caye, which surround a central lagoon. Smaller surrounding islands include:

Lighthouse Reef

The Lighthouse Reef system is a sunken atoll, and consists of four islands:

Glover's Reef
The Glover's Reef system is mostly submerged, with a few tiny islands. see list above.

Islands in rivers and lakes
Last Chance Caye, in Midwinter's Lagoon
Marlowe Caye, in Midwinter's Lagoon
Shipstern Caye, in Chetumal Bay
Sarstoon Island, in the Sarstoon River
Crooked Tree Wildlife Sanctuary is Crooked Tree Lagoon

See also 

 List of Caribbean islands
 List of islands
 List of rivers in Belize

References

External links 

 
 Islands of Belize, United Nations Environment Programme
 WorldIslandInfo.com

 
Islands
Belize
Atlantic Ocean-related lists